Kim Do-kyun (born January 12, 1973), more commonly known as Bobby Kim (Hangul: 바비 킴), is a South Korean hip hop and R&B artist.

Music career

His father, a trumpet player, influenced and exposed him to music. At an early age, he worked as a rapper at night clubs. Since high school, he performed in clubs in the San Francisco underground. That time, he got attracted by hip hop when America was in a golden age of hip hop, but he learned many genres of music as well. Later in 1992, he went to Korea to start his music career. In 1994, he debuted as a member of a group called ‘Dr. Reggae.” However, the group could not achieve much success. Thus, he started doing features as a background rapper, appearing on numerous singles. Also, he worked as a producer, creating singles for artists in Korea.

Bobby Kim is about to release his second special album “OLD & NEW‘ on July 6, 2012. The album is to feature remakes of old songs as well as new tracks for fans to enjoy a total of 11 tracks.

Dr. Reggae and I Am A Singer

After he finished high school, he made a group called Dr. Reggae and introduced Reggae music to Korea for the first time. At that time, only two members were active, so it was known as a duet. However, it was actually seven members at first. Bobby Kim was not as successful when he was a part of Dr. Reggae. After Dr. Reggae disbanded, he became a vocal trainer for hip hop singers and taught singing and rapping techniques. He was nicknamed ‘Reggae hip hop's godfather.’ He also wrote songs for singers such as Drunken Tiger, Leessang, and Dynamic Duo.

His songs showed a unique rhythm. After his colleagues listened to his music, they suggested he sing his own songs. Therefore, he produced his debut album called ‘Beat Within my Soul.’

On 11 September 2011, he appeared during the sixth session of the show I Am a Singer, but he was voted off at the eleventh session, which was on 1 January 2012.

Controversy allegations 
Kim was accused of sexually harassing a flight attendant and creating a disturbance while drunk on a flight from Korea to the United States in January 2015.
 Kim stopped appearing in all television shows, including the TV Art Stage. On June 11, 2015, Incheon District Court's Judge, Shim Dong-young, issued Kim with a fine of 4 million Won, and ordered him to complete a 40-hour sexual violence educational program for infringing upon an aviation law and for forcibly harassing an airline employee.

Personal life 
On May 5, 2022, Bobby Kim plans to marry his non-celebrity girlfriend on June 10, 2022 at a church in Seoul. to invite family and close acquaintances.

Discography

Studio albums

Extended plays

Singles

Soundtrack appearances

Other charted songs

Awards

Mnet Asian Music Awards

Notes

References

External links

 website

1973 births
Living people
South Korean male rappers
Korean Music Award winners